Kate Elliott (born 30 December 1981) is a New Zealand television and film actress. She was born in and currently resides in Auckland, New Zealand.

Kate played the role of one of the "Liberators" in The Cult. More recently, she has acted in The Insider's Guide To Love, The Locals, Fracture, and Toy Love. She played Yakut, an Amazon, in several episodes of Xena: Warrior Princess, 1998–2000.  Elliott also assumed the role of Lily in Cleopatra 2525. She plays a vampire in a film called 30 Days Of Night and currently plays the role of Detective Jess Savage in the New Zealand mini-series The Gulf.

She was married to Pluto's lead singer, Milan Borich, on 17 January 2006. They have a daughter. In 2016 she eloped with David Benge, managing director of the New Zealand office of worldwide media company VICE. Both marriages had ended by 2019.
Elliott came out queer to her daughter in 2019

Filmography

Film

Television

Video games

References

External links

1981 births
Living people
New Zealand film actresses
New Zealand television actresses
New Zealand video game actresses
New Zealand voice actresses
People from Auckland
20th-century New Zealand actresses
21st-century New Zealand actresses
Queer actresses
New Zealand LGBT actors